Frederikshavnsvej railway halt is a railway halt serving the western part of the town of Skagen in Vendsyssel, Denmark.

The halt is located on the Skagensbanen railway line from Skagen to Frederikshavn between Skagen station and Hulsig station. The stop was opened in 1992, primarily for the many student commuters who travel daily between Skagen and Frederikshavn. The train services are currently operated by the railway company Nordjyske Jernbaner which run frequent local train services between Skagen and Frederikshavn with onward connections by train to the rest of Denmark.

See also
 List of railway stations in Denmark

References

External links

 Nordjyske Jernbaner – Danish railway company operating in North Jutland Region
 Danske Jernbaner – website with information on railway history in Denmark
 Nordjyllands Jernbaner – website with information on railway history in North Jutland
 Skagensiden.dk – website with information on Skagen

Railway stations in the North Jutland Region
Railway stations opened in 1992
Skagen
Railway stations in Denmark opened in the 20th century